Edin Omeragic (born 20 March 2002) is a Swiss footballer of Bosnian descent. He plays for Servette.

Club career
He joined the youth teams of Servette at the age of 7 and started playing for their U21 squad in the 2. Liga Interregional in 2019.

He made his Swiss Super League debut for Servette on 3 October 2021 in a game against Young Boys. He came on as a substitute in the 45th minute after Jérémy Frick was sent off and allowed 6 goals in the remaining time of a 0–6 home loss.

Personal life
His father Nihad Omeragić and uncle Nedžad immigrated to Switzerland from Bosnia and Herzegovina as refugees and played in the lower Swiss leagues for Urania Genève Sport. His cousins Bećir Omeragić and Nedim Omeragić (sons of Nedžad) are also professional footballers.

References

External links
 

2002 births
Footballers from Geneva
Swiss people of Bosnia and Herzegovina descent
Living people
Swiss men's footballers
Switzerland youth international footballers
Association football goalkeepers
Servette FC players
2. Liga Interregional players
Swiss Super League players